Hrib–Loški Potok is a village in the Municipality of Loški Potok in southern Slovenia. It is also the administrative centre of the municipality. The area is part of the traditional region of Lower Carniola and is now included in the Southeast Slovenia Statistical Region.

Name
The name of the settlement was changed from Hrib to Hrib - Loški potok in 1953.

Church
The parish church in the settlement is dedicated to Saint Leonard and belongs to the Roman Catholic Archdiocese of Ljubljana. It was built in 1670 on the site of a 14th-century building. It has an octagonal floor plan and a large belfry. A second church in the settlement is dedicated to Saint Barbara and dates to the 17th century.

References

External links
Hrib–Loški Potok on Geopedia

Populated places in the Municipality of Loški Potok